Tara Johanna Elders (born 17 January 1980) is a Dutch actress. She has been in Dutch films and TV series. She also was in the American film Interview (2007).

Early life and education 
Tara Johanna Elders was born on 17 January 1980 in Amsterdam in the Netherlands.

She studied acting at De Trap, an acting school in Amsterdam.

Acting career 
She participated in the alternative talent show Ben ik in beeld? on Dutch national television. After some minor roles, Elders played Fleur Lion in the TV series TV7 (2002) about a fictional television station.

She played in the TV series Najib en Julia (2002), the film 06/05 (2004), and the TV mini series Medea (2005), all written and directed by Theo van Gogh. She also was in the American film Interview (2007), directed by Steve Buscemi, which is a remake of the 2003 Dutch film Interview of Theo van Gogh.

Other films she played in are Phileine Says Sorry (2003), Pipo en de p-p-Parelridder (2003), Hush Hush Baby (2004), and Vox populi (2008).

Personal life 
Elders married Dutch actor Michiel Huisman in a ceremony in 2008. They have a daughter (born 2007). Elders retired from acting in 2009 in order to be a full-time mother. They lived in New Orleans, Louisiana, US until 2017, when they moved to New York City.

Filmography

Films

TV series

References

External links 
 

1980 births
21st-century Dutch actresses
Actresses from Amsterdam
Dutch expatriates in the United States
Dutch film actresses
Dutch television actresses
De Trap Theater Academy alumni
Living people